The Central Bank of Montenegro (or CBCG) is the central bank of Montenegro. Although Montenegro does not issue its own currency after it unilaterally adopted the euro in 2002, the stated mission of the central bank is to establish and maintain a sound banking system and monetary policy.

The Central Bank of Montenegro was established by the Parliament of Montenegro in November 2000, when the country was part of a political union of Serbia and Montenegro. With its establishment, the Republic of Montenegro obtained an independent authority responsible for monetary policy, and establishment and maintenance of sound banking system and efficient payment system operations.

The Montenegrin monetary system was eurized in 1999, when German Mark was adopted as a legal tender, alongside Yugoslav Dinar. Montenegro has not issued its own currency since, as it has unilaterally adopted the euro in 2002. 

The Central Bank of Montenegro does not participate in the European System of Central Banks or in ECB meetings. However, it tracks ECB policy, making the latter the de facto central bank of Montenegro for economic and monetary purposes. One of the main proclaimed goals of the Central Bank of Montenegro is the accession of the country to the Eurozone. Montenegro does not mint issue or print euro coins or notes and imports them from other countries that are part of the Eurozone.

Governors
The current Governor of the Central bank of Montenegro is Radoje Žugić, as of October 1, 2016. The position of the Governor was created after Montenegro achieved independence in 2006. The holder of the office is confirmed by vote in Parliament. 

Ljubiša Krgović, March 2001 - November 2010
Radoje Žugić, November 2010 - December 2012
Milojica Dakić, January 2013 - October 2016
Radoje Žugić, October 2016 - present

History

The Central Bank of Montenegro is the supreme institution of the monetary system of Montenegro.

It was established by the Law on the Central Bank, in November 2000, and began its work on March 15, 2001, which makes it one of the youngest central banks in the world.

The Constitution of Montenegro is defined as "an independent organization responsible for the monetary and financial stability and functioning of the banking system".

In fulfilling the responsibilities assigned to the Constitution, the Bank, among other things: performs supervision of the banking system; performs and controls inter-bank payment operations in the country and abroad; acts as a fiscal agent, a banker and a state advisor, and performs regular macroeconomic analyzes, giving recommendations to the Government for Economic Policy.

The Montenegrin economy is dollarized (eurized), since the monetary system of Montenegro is based on the euro, as the official means of payment, since the end of March 2002. Montenegro accepted the dollarization regime on November 2, 1999, when a two-tier system with a German brand and a dinar was introduced. Since January 2001, the sole means of payment was the German mark until the introduction of the euro in March 2002.

One of the strategic objectives of the CBM is to join the Eurosystem, which would officially become a part of Montenegro.

The mission

The CBM is not an issuing bank, and it has the following powers and responsibilities in the performance of its functions determined by law:
To issue and withdraw licenses to banks and financial institutions, to regulate and supervise their operation and conduct bankruptcy and liquidation proceedings over banks and financial institutions in the Republic.
To give loans from its reserves to licensed banks in the Republic, under the conditions determined by law.
To prescribe and undertake measures, and regulate and supervise payment system, settlement and inter-bank clearing in the Republic.
To carry out and supervise the domestic and international payment system.
To act as a banker, advisor and fiscal agent of the bodies and authorities of the Republic.
To buy and sell currencies and precious metals on its own behalf or on behalf of the Republic.
To buy and sell securities on the secondary market issued by the Republic, European Union member states, or other states designated in the Central Bank regulation.
To make regular macroeconomic analyses, including monetary, fiscal, financial and balance of payment studies of the Republic economy, and to give recommendations in the area of economic policy to the Republic.
To prepare and participate in preparation of laws and other regulations in monetary, foreign currency and banking system, in accordance with international standards, including determination of reserves for various types of deposits.
To provide banking services in favor of foreign governments, foreign central banks as well as international organizations and other international institutions in which Central Bank of the Republic are members.
To take deposits from banks, state agencies and organizations.
To establish and maintain accounts for the needs of state bodies and organizations, local and foreign banks, international financial institutions and donor organizations.
To prescribe manner of operations for dealers and banks in foreign exchange transactions, set limits on foreign exchange positions of dealers and banks and perform their control.
May be owner and manage one or more payment systems, including one real time gross payment system.
May manage a real time net payment system.
To provide banknotes and coins in quantities appropriate to satisfy the needs of financial transactions.
To perform other operations determined by this and other laws.

See also
Economy of Montenegro
Montenegro and the euro

References

External links
  

Banks of Montenegro
Montenegro
Banks established in 2001
2001 establishments in Montenegro